"Temporary Secretary" is a song by Paul McCartney, featured on his 1980 album McCartney II. In 2013, Rolling Stone ranked it the #36 all-time McCartney post-Beatles song, calling it a "cult favorite" and an "oddly catchy electro-pop nugget, about a slightly creepy-sounding guy looking to hire a temp." In 2014, "Temporary Secretary" was ranked as the 167th greatest song of all time by critics of NME magazine. They described it as "wonky electropop that didn't sound so much ahead of its time as out of it altogether."

Background

McCartney later said that he had had temporary secretaries, and that there was a real Mr. Marks.

Release
"Temporary Secretary" was released as a third single from the album only in a form of 12" single, along with the ten-minute "Secret Friend" as its B-side, but it was limited to 25,000 copies and therefore failed to chart. A 7" single exists only as a demo for radio stations. It exemplifies both the whimsical nature of the album and McCartney's use of synthesizers and other electronics in the creation of the album. McCartney said the song was an "experiment."

Live performances
McCartney performed "Temporary Secretary" live for the first time 35 years after its release: on May 23, 2015, at the O2 Arena in London. He performed it live at some dates during the 2015 legs of his Out There tour and at some dates during his 2016–2017 One on One tour.

Reception
Decades after its release, music website Allmusic.com said of the album, McCartney II:

In contrast, music website popmatters.com said, in reviewing the 2011 reissue of McCartney II: 

Beatles biographers Roy Carr and Tony Tyler described the song as built from an initial, repetitive synthesizer theme, with more substantial instrumental portions added over time, and finally an insubstantial vocal. They said the song was done without commitment and that it "grows irritating towards the end."

Rolling Stone rated "Temporary Secretary" to be McCartney's 36th greatest post-Beatles song.

Chart history

Track listing
12" single (12 R 6039)
 "Temporary Secretary" – 3:13
 "Secret Friend" – 10:30

Personnel
"Temporary Secretary"
Paul McCartney – vocals, acoustic guitar, bass, keyboards, drums, synthesizer, sequencer

"Secret Friend"
Paul McCartney – vocals, bass, synthesizers, electric guitar, keyboards, drums, shaker, percussion

References

External links
 

Paul McCartney songs
1980 singles
Songs written by Paul McCartney
Song recordings produced by Paul McCartney
Parlophone singles
Music published by MPL Music Publishing
1980 songs
Electropop songs